"Let's Get Ridiculous" is a song by American singer, dancer, DJ and rapper Redfoo, also known for being half of the duo LMFAO. It was released on September 8, 2013. The song, written and produced by himself, debuted at number 1 on the Australian Singles Chart.
This song is currently the theme song for AC ROC, a professional wrestling independent wrestling tag team at Monster Factory. In 2018 it was used by MTV in promos for Jersey Shore Family Vacation.

Music video
The music video for this song was shot in Manly, New South Wales, whilst Redfoo was featured as a judge on the fifth season of The X Factor Australia. His then-girlfriend, former world number one tennis player, Victoria Azarenka, makes a cameo appearance in the video clip as a flight attendant.

The Footy Show panellist Darryl Brohman parodied the song's music video in early February 2014, which was also shot in Manly, New South Wales. Its lyrics references the famous refereeing outbursts made by Manly-Warringah Sea Eagles coach Geoff Toovey during a National Rugby League (NRL) match in August 2013.

The music video was released on Redfoo's YouTube Channel on October 25, 2013 and has reached more than 101 million views as of April 2019.

Synopsis 
The plot of the video involves Stefan Gordy, who is being charged for crimes against conformity which was contributed to the worldwide epidemic, escapes from the Boeing 747-8 while he was being deported. Now a free, but wanted man, he lands on Manly, NSW after taking a selfie with his smartwatch, and ends up being chased by the police upon greeting them and seeing the wanted poster of Gordy himself, which attracts huge attention to his fans in Australia, whom they also chased after him, and while he was dancing with nearby people, and eventually with the crowd of Redfoo's fans (which implies with the lyrics saying "Crazy, loud, get wild in the crowd.").

Chart performance

Weekly charts

Year-end charts

Certifications

Release history

References

External links
Official lyrics video on YouTube

2013 singles
Redfoo songs
Interscope Records singles
2013 songs
Number-one singles in Australia
Songs written by Redfoo